

Ernst Merk (27 September 1903 – 12 June 1975) was a general in the Army of Nazi Germany during World War II. He was a recipient of the Knight's Cross of the Iron Cross.

Awards

 Knight's Cross of the Iron Cross on 15 July 1944 as Oberst im Generalstab and chief of the general staff of the III. Panzerkorps

References

Citations

Bibliography

 

1903 births
1975 deaths
Military personnel from Fürth
People from the Kingdom of Bavaria
Recipients of the Gold German Cross
Recipients of the Knight's Cross of the Iron Cross
Major generals of the German Army (Wehrmacht)
Military personnel from Bavaria